is a term of Japanese origin that has been used by environmentalists. The term in Japanese conveys a sense of regret over waste; the exclamation "" can translate as "What a waste!" Japanese environmentalists have used the term to encourage people to "reduce, reuse and recycle", and Kenyan environmentalist Wangari Maathai used the term at the United Nations as a slogan to promote environmental protection.

Etymology, usage, and translation 

Kōjien, widely considered the most authoritative Japanese dictionary, lists three definitions for the word  (classical Japanese terminal form ): (1) inexpedient or reprehensible towards a god, buddha, noble or the like; (2) awe-inspiring and unmerited/undeserved, used to express thanks; (3) an expression of regret at the full value of something not being put to good use. In contemporary Japanese,  is most commonly used to indicate that something is being discarded needlessly, or to express regret at such a fact. , then a professor at Nagano University, noted that the definition (3) in Kōjien was the one used most frequently by modern Japanese. The second sense is seen in Japanese newspapers when they refer to members of the imperial family as having been present at such-and-such an event, not necessarily implying wastefulness but rather gratitude or awe. , another Japanese dictionary, gives a similar ordering of these definitions.

Hasegawa traces this increase in the frequency of meaning (3) to a historical semantic shift in which the original meaning, meaning (1), became less prominent. Citing the Kyoto University Japanese literature scholar , Hasegawa states that the word originated as slang in the Kamakura period, and that by the mid 15th century had perhaps already acquired the meanings of (2) and (3).

A form of the word,  (モタイナ) appears in the late-14th or early-15th century Noh play , apparently in a sense close to (1).

The word  in  resembles a Japanese negative ("there is no "), but may have originally been used as an emphatic ("tremendous ").  itself is a noun appearing as such in, for example, the dictionary , which dates to 1444. It means (i) the shape/form of a thing or (ii) something that is, or the fact of being, impressive or imposing.

The 18th-century Kokugaku philologist Motoori Norinaga, in the preface to his 1798 treatise Tamaarare ('Ice Crystals (like) Jewels') designed to stir people up from their sleepy acquiescence in acquired customs that were not authentically native, and was critical of the use of the word to express gratitude. In his 1934 essay Nihon-seishin to Bukkyō, the Buddhologist  Katō Totsudō (1870-1949) included the "aversion to wastefulness" in a putative series of what he considered to be "core Japanese personality traits".

Modern Japanese environmentalism 
In November 2002, the English-language, Japan-based magazine Look Japan ran a cover story entitled "Restyling Japan: Revival of the 'Mottainai' Spirit", documenting the motivation amongst volunteers in a "toy hospital" in Japan to "develop in children the habit of looking after their possessions", the re-emergence of repair shops specializing in repairing household appliances or children's clothes, the recycling of PET bottles and other materials, the collection of waste edible oil, and more generally the efforts to stop the trend of throwing away everything that can no longer be used, i.e. the efforts of reviving "the spirit of ". In that context, Hitoshi Chiba, the author, described  as follows:

She also cited a number of views of Japanese authors who believed that it was a uniquely Japanese "contribution to the world", whose views she characterized as mostly being "deeply rooted in cultural generalizations, essentialisms, and disdainful comparisons between countries".

Use by Wangari Maathai 

At a session of the United Nations, Kenyan environmentalist Wangari Maathai introduced the word  as a slogan for environmental protection. According to Mizue Sasaki,

Maathai worked to popularize the word  in places outside Japan. At the 2009 United Nations Summit on Climate Change, she said, "Even at personal level, we can all reduce, re-use and recycle, what is embraced as Mottainai in Japan, a concept that also calls us to express gratitude, to respect and to avoid wastage."

See also
Affluenza
Anti-consumerism
Bal tashchit
Conspicuous consumption
Freeganism
Frugality
Mottainai Grandma
"Mottai Night Land", a Kyary Pamyu Pamyu song which has Mottai nai in the title
Muda, mura and muri, three types of waste in lean manufacturing
Planned obsolescence
Simple living

References

Citations

Works cited

External links
Mottainai Campaign official site
Mottainai Movement in Brazil

Value (ethics)
Social philosophy
Japanese philosophy
Japanese business terms
Japanese words and phrases
Resource economics
Waste management concepts
Words and phrases with no direct English translation
Environmentalism in Japan